Toma is a town located in the province of Nayala in Burkina Faso.

It is the capital of Nayala Province.

References 

Populated places in the Boucle du Mouhoun Region
Nayala Province